Judith Westphalen (June 2, 1922 – December 31, 1976) was a Peruvian painter known for her abstract artwork.

Westphalen was born in Catacaos, Peru in 1922. After participating in a collective exposition in Viña del Mar in 1946, she had her first individual show in Lima in 1947. She lived and worked along with her husband, the writer Emilio Adolfo Westphalen, in Lima, New York City, Los Boliches (Spain), Florence, and Rome. Her work was shown in Peru, the US, Italy, Chile, Spain, Mexico, and Belgium.

She died in Rome on December 31, 1976.

A major retrospective of her work was held from June to August 2007 in the Municipal Galleries of Miraflores (Lima).

References

1922 births
1976 deaths
Peruvian women artists
20th-century Peruvian painters
20th-century women artists
Peruvian expatriates in the United States
Peruvian expatriates in Spain
Peruvian expatriates in Italy